Human Studies is a quarterly peer-reviewed academic journal of the humanities. It was established in 1978 and is published by Springer Science+Business Media. It is the official journal of the Society for Phenomenology and the Human Sciences. The editor-in-chief is Martin Endress (University of Trier). According to the Journal Citation Reports, the journal has a 2017 impact factor of 0.582.

References

External links

Quarterly journals
Multidisciplinary humanities journals
Springer Science+Business Media academic journals
English-language journals
Publications established in 1978